This is a list of Filipino comics creators or komikeros. Although comics have different formats, this list covers creators of editorial cartoons, comic books, graphic novels and comic strips, along with early innovators. The list presents authors with the Philippines as their country of origin, although they may have published or now be resident in other countries. For other countries, see List of comic creators.

A
Lib Abrena (Ipo-ipo)
Manix Abrera (Kikomachine Komix)
Dani Aguila (Barrio Breeze, The Cock and Bull) 
Gerry Alanguilan (Wasted, Elmer)
Alfredo Alcala (Voltar)
Larry Alcala
Fred Alcantara
Mar Amongo
Jay Anacleto
Rene Aranda (Prof, Sports Manny)
Arnold Arre (After Eden, The Mythology Class, Trip to Tagaytay)

B
Kajo Baldisimo (Trese)
Charlie Baldorado
Delfin "Dell" Barras
Edgar Bercasio
Manuel Buising
Danny Bulanadi

C
Cris CaGuintuan
Jose C. Caluag
Carlo J. Caparas
Fred Carrillo
Jojie M. Casiao
Nar Castro
Joey Celerio
Vincente "Vicatan" Doria Catan Jr.
Ernie Chan
Elizabeth Chionglo (Love Knots)
Rene b. Clemente
Francisco Coching (Marabini, Hagibis, El Indio)
Gregorio C. Coching
Karl Comendador
William Contreras (Tok & Mol)
Pia Maria Coll (Tuldok)
Arnel R. Coronel
Eufronio "E. R." Reyes Cruz

D
Jun R. De Leon
Ronnie del Carmen
Mike del Mundo
Oscar del Rosario (Ipo-ipo)
Floro Dery
Tony DeZuniga (Jonah Hex, Black Orchid)
Jonas Diego

E
Jim E. Espallardo
Rod Espinosa

F
Ruben M. Fabian
Jim Fernandez  (Anak ni Zuma)
Don Figueroa
Rudy Florese

G
Steve Gan
Diogenes A. Gelito Jr.
Buddy Gernale
Bong Gimena
Pablo S. Gomez
Adrian "Ading" Gonzales
Paquito E. Gonzales
Lyndon Gregorio (Beerkada Comics)

H
Teny Henson

I
Ramil Ibay
Nestor Infante
Jo Ingente Jr.

J
Richard G. Jacinto (Scriptwriter/Contributor to GASI from 1982 to 1996)
Federico C. Javinal
Jay Jimenez
Jim Jimenez
Jess Jodloman

K
Emiliana Kampilan
Rafael Kayanan
Vincent Kua Jr.

L
Abel Laxamana
Joe Mari Lee
Carlos V. Lemos
Nestor Leonidez
Jun Lofamia
Bert Lopez
Nes Lucero
Jonathan Luna
Joshua Luna

M
Nestor Malgapo
Nick Manabat
Francis Manapul
Ben Maniclang
Fred D. Marchadesch
Nonoy Marcelo
Petronilo Z. Marcelo
Menny Eusobio Martin
Rodel Martin
Roy Allan Martinez
Lan Medina
Pol Medina, Jr. (Pugad Baboy)
Rudy Mesina
Gilbert Monsanto
Yong Montaño

N
 Chuck Nanco
Rudy Nebres
Alex Niño
Delando Niño

O
Abe Ocampo
Gilda Olvidado
Jeffrey Marcelino Ong
Jerome Opeña
Joey Otacan

P
Carlo Pagulayan
Noly Panaligan
Hermoso D. Pancho
Elena Patron
Whilce Portacio

Q

R
Mars Ravelo (Darna, Dyesebel, Captain Barbell, Lastikman, Bondying, Varga, Maruja, Flash Bomba, Tiny Tony, Dragonna, Trudis Liit)
 Kevin Eric Raymundo (Creator of Tarantadong Kalbo)
 Frank Redondo
Nestor Redondo (Rima, Darna)
Virgilio Redondo
Francisco "Franc" Reyes (Kulafu, Talahib, Kilabot, Buhawi, Mahiwagang Sinulid)
Pedrito Reyes
Rico Rival
Albert Rodriguez (Crazy Jhenny)
Emilio Rodriguez
Dionisio J. Roque

S
Gil Sabas
Mar Santana
Hal Santiago
Larry R. Santiago
Jesse Santos
Mauro Malang Santos
Bert R. Sarile
Cal Sobrepeña
Ian Sta. Maria

T
Edgar Tadeo
Gerry Talaoc
Budjette Tan (Trese)
Philip Tan
Romeo Tanghal
Nestor Tantiado
Dannie Taverna
Harvey Tolibao
Elpidio Torres
Wilson Tortosa
Francisco "Corky" Flores Trinidad, Jr. (Nguyen Charlie)
Celso L. "Sonny" Trinidad
Noel Tuazon

U

V
Romeo Valdez
Randy Valiente
Ohrlee Vee
Tony Velasquez (Kenkoy)
Carlo Vergara
Richie Villamiel
Andrew Villar (Agents Of Ambush)

W

X

Y
Ruben Yandoc
Leinil Francis Yu (Wave)

Z
José Zabala-Santos
Noly Zamora
John Carlo Velasco (Ang Kuwento ng Kahariang Etniko)

See also 

 List of Filipino komik artists
 List of Filipino komiks
 List of Filipino superheroes
 List of Filipino supervillains

References

 The Philippine Comics Art Museum
 Celebrating 120 Years of Komiks From the Philippines I: The History of Komiks, Newsarama, October 19, 2006
 Celebrating 120 Years of Komiks From the Philippines II: The Future of Komiks, Newsarama, October 21, 2006
 Lent, John A. (2009) The First One Hundred Years of Philippine Komiks and Cartoons. Boboy Yonzon.
 Roxas, Cynthia and Joaquin Arevalo, Jr. A History of komiks of the Philippines and other countries, with contributions by Soledad S. Reyes, Karina Constantino-David, Efren Abueg; edited by Ramon R. Marcelino

External links
 "Philippine Comics" The most comprehensive library of Filipino comics on the internet.
 Lambiek's Comiclopedia

 
Philippine comic creators
Filipino comics artists
Filipino comics writers